Liu Jiayin is a Chinese independent filmmaker and educator, born in Beijing in 1981. She has made two experimental features combining documentary and narrative elements, Oxhide (2005) and Oxhide II (2009), both of which received international awards.

First film
Liu aspired to become a filmmaker as early as high school. As her graduation project at the Beijing Film Academy (BFA), she completed Oxhide, her full-length feature debut. Liu used digital video and a series of long takes to stage scenes from the life of her family in their cramped Beijing apartment. Her mother and her father—a struggling skilled leather craftsman whose work material gives the film its title—perform their own parts, alongside the 23-year-old director as herself. Oxhide was screened in 2005 at the Berlin International Film Festival, where it took two prizes, including the FIPRESCI Award in the Forum of New Cinema. It also screened at the Hong Kong International Film Festival, where Liu received the Golden DV Award for best digital work, and at the Vancouver International Film Festival, where she received the top Dragons and Tigers Award for East Asian cinema.

Second film
In 2009 Liu finished her second film, Oxhide II. With a similar focus on her family, this "sequel" was seen as more simple and radical in construction, employing only nine separate shots in a running time of over two hours. All the film's narrative occurs in the real-time process of Liu and her family preparing to make, making, cooking and eating jiaozi (Chinese dumplings). A marked contrast not only to commercial film aesthetics but also with other independent films from China, Oxhide II premiered at the 2009 Cannes Film Festival as part of its Directors Fortnight program. At the end of the year, Oxhide II was named one of the three masterpieces of Chinese cinema in the 2000s decade by critic Shelly Kraicer.

Neither of Liu's films received commercial theatrical distribution, but her works are distributed in North America digitally by Dgenerate Films. Her works have also been screened at universities in China and abroad. Today she teaches in the literature department at BFA.

References

 

1981 births
Living people
Film directors from Beijing
Beijing Film Academy alumni